Steven Paulle (born 10 February 1986 in Cannes) is a French former footballer who plays as a centre back.

Career
Paulle has previously played for hometown club Cannes amassing over 100 league appearances with the club before departing for Dijon.

In February 2019, he moved to Persija Jakarta.

Honours
Dijon
 Ligue 2 Runner-up: 2015–16
PSM Makassar
 Liga 1 Runner-up: 2018

References

External links 
 
 

Living people
1986 births
Sportspeople from Cannes
French footballers
Association football defenders
AS Cannes players
Dijon FCO players
PSM Makassar players
Persija Jakarta players
Ligue 1 players
Ligue 2 players
Liga 1 (Indonesia) players
Footballers from Provence-Alpes-Côte d'Azur